National Secondary Route 106, or just Route 106 (or ) is a National Road Route of Costa Rica, located in the Heredia province. Is a parallel road north to a segment of Route 1.

Description
In Heredia province the route covers Heredia canton (Ulloa district).

This road starts in the junction with Route 3 at La Valencia in Heredia, and ends in the Junction with Route 1 and Route 111 near Real Cariari mall.

History

A bridge over La Guaria creek in 2008 was partially destroyed, in one of the lanes a Bailey bridge was installed.  In September 2019 the works to install a new prefabricated bridge were started.

The same creek also damaged a culvert on Route 1 in 2012.

References

Highways in Costa Rica